Major Samuel B Cornelius Field Airport  is an airport located 1 mile north of Spearman, Texas. The airport was opened in June 1982. The airport normally handles about 20 aircraft every day. The airport was named in honor of Major Samuel B Cornelius, who died in Cambodia in 1973.

References

External links 

Airports in Texas
Airports established in 1982
Transportation in Hansford County, Texas